The 2002–2004 European Nations Cup was the fourth edition of the newly reformed European Championship for tier 2 & 3 Rugby Union Nations. This was the second two-year cycled championship, the first to be planned from the start.

The Third division had a controversy development. The team were divided into three groups according to the ranking of previous edition to play, but there were several problems:
 In pool "A" Andorra withdrew and only four teams remained.
 In pool "C" Monaco were banned after the match with Finland, because of the presence of a French player that was not eligible to play for Monaco.
 Again in pool "C" the match between Bulgaria and Norway was annulled because the designed referee wasn't able to arrive in Sofia and was substituted by another referee, called by the Bulgarian federation.

So the European federation decided to change from a two-years formula to a one-year formula again, considering the two matches played in Pool "C" as friendlies and turning the Pool into a short knock-out tournament held in Ibiza, Spain. Furthermore, the winners of Pools B and C were promoted, respectively, to Pools A and B for the 2003–04 edition. No promotions from Pool A to Second division were awarded, nor relegations to lower Pools.

Pool A 
The highest level was the Pool "A", with five teams:
  relegated from second division
 
 
  promoted from Group B
  (retired from competition)

Table

Results

Pool B 
The middle level was the Pool "B", with five teams:
  relegated from pool "A"
 
 
 
  promoted from pool "C"

Table

  promoted to Pool A

Results

Pool C 
 "No official" match :

Semifinals

Third place final

First place final 

   promoted to Pool B

See also 
 2003–2004 European Nations Cup First Division
 2002–2004 European Nations Cup Second Division
 2003–2004 European Nations Cup Third Division

Sources

www.irb.com

2002–03
2002–03 in European rugby union